Alcide d'Orbigny describes the Cuban pygmy owl in Ramón de la Sagra's monumental Historia física, política y natural de la isla de Cuba
1839-1840 Christian Ferdinand Friedrich Krauss, Johan August Wahlberg and Adulphe Delegorgue :fr:Adulphe Delegorgue explore Natal
Juan Gundlach leaves Europe for Cuba
1839-1843 James Clark Ross expedition to Antarctica
Frédéric de Lafresnaye describes the spot-crowned woodcreeper in  Revue Zoologique, par la Société Cuvierienne  (Paris), René Primevère Lesson contributes the description of  the black-headed honeyeater to the same journal
Costa's hummingbird named to honour Louis Marie Pantaleon Costa.
Foundation of Musée d'histoire naturelle de Mons
Foundation of Museum d’Histoire Naturelle Aix en Provence

Ongoing events
William Jardine and Prideaux John Selby with the co-operation of James Ebenezer Bicheno Illustrations of ornithology various publishers (Four volumes) 1825 and [1836–43]. Although issued partly in connection with the volume of plates, under the same title (at the time of issue), text and plates were purchasable separately and the publishers ... express the hope, also voiced by the author in his preface to the present work, that the text will constitute an independent work of reference. Vol. I was issued originally in 1825 [by A. Constable, Edinburgh], with nomenclature according to Temminck

References

Birding and ornithology by year
1840 in science